Henrik Jorgensen is a Danish Paralympic athlete and boccia player who has competed in five Paralympic Games.

Career
Henrik made his Paralympic debut in 1984, competing in athletics and boccia. In New York/Stoke Mandeville 1984 he won three gold medals, the men's slalom and precision throw and individual boccia C1. In 1984, boccia was making its Paralympics debut, so he became one of its first champions. In the boccia, he beat Russell Cecchini of Canada in the final. Starting from Seoul 1988 he moved into boccia permanently and became a master player, winning three silver and two bronze medals in the sport.

In Barcelona 1992, he won the individual bronze medal match against Juan Tellechea from Spain. Henrik had lost in the semifinal to James Thomson from the USA.

In Atlanta 1996, he won the silver medal in Boccia Individual C1 after losing to Hae Ryung Kim from South Korea.

After missing the Sydney 2000 Paralympics, he returned for Athens 2004, but failed to medal. In the Individual Event he lost in the quarter-final. In the Team Event, he didn't make it into the finals. It was his last Paralympics to date.

References

Year of birth missing (living people)
Living people
Paralympic athletes of Denmark
Paralympic boccia players of Denmark
Paralympic gold medalists for Denmark
Paralympic silver medalists for Denmark
Paralympic bronze medalists for Denmark
Paralympic medalists in athletics (track and field)
Paralympic medalists in boccia
Athletes (track and field) at the 1984 Summer Paralympics
Athletes (track and field) at the 1988 Summer Paralympics
Boccia players at the 1984 Summer Paralympics
Boccia players at the 1988 Summer Paralympics
Boccia players at the 1992 Summer Paralympics
Boccia players at the 1996 Summer Paralympics
Boccia players at the 2004 Summer Paralympics
Medalists at the 1984 Summer Paralympics
Medalists at the 1988 Summer Paralympics
Medalists at the 1992 Summer Paralympics
Medalists at the 1996 Summer Paralympics